Məlikli or Melikli or Myalikli or Malikli may refer to:
Məlikli, Agdam, Azerbaijan
Məlikli, Qabala, Azerbaijan
Məlikli, Yardymli, Azerbaijan
Melikli, Zangilan, Azerbaijan
Məlikli, Zardab, Azerbaijan